Fred Lowe (born 19 November 1947) is an Olympic weightlifter from the United States.

About
Frederick Harland "Fred" Lowe has competed in the sport of weightlifting in several different bodyweight categories and stands 5 feet 2 inches tall.  He was born in Toledo, Ohio and grew up in Lambertville, Michigan, a small town in Monroe County just north of the Michigan-Ohio state line.

Organizations
After beginning weightlifting training on 7/08/65, he began competition on 11/20/65 in Marion, Indiana. During his elite competitive years in the senior division, he competed for Chicago's Duncan YMCA and later for York Barbell Club, York.

Weightlifting achievements
8th place in the men's Middle Weight in Mexico City (1968)
9th place in men's Middleweight in Munich (1972)
11th place in men's Middleweight in Montreal (1976)
Olympic Games team member (1968, 1972, and 1976)
World Team Member 1969, 1970, 1973, 1981
Senior National Champion (1969, 1970, 1972, 1973, 1974, 1975, 1976, and 1981)
Teenage U.S. Records: Press 294 lbs (11/11/67), Snatch 273 lbs (11/11/67), Clean and Jerk 357 lbs (11/11/67), Total 915 lbs (11/11/67)
U.S. Senior Records: Clean & Jerk 394.5 lbs (2/24/68), 396.75 lbs (6/10/73), 398 lbs (6/6/81), 402.25 lbs (6/6/81), Two-Lift Total: 683.25 lbs (8/31/72), 694.25 lbs (6/10/73)
First U.S. weightlifter in 75 kg (165 lb) division to clean & jerk over 400 lbs
First U.S. weightlifter to compete along with his daughter in U.S. Nationals (1997)
Competed in 16 U.S. National Championships
Only U.S. weightlifter to qualify for and compete in U.S. Nationals in 6 different decades: 1968, 1969, 1970, 1971, 1972, 1973, 1974, 1975, 1976, 1980, 1981, 1997, 1998, 1999, 2000, 2011
Has competed in 15 World Masters Championships
World Masters Champion 9 Times: 1993, 1996, 1997, 1998, 1999, 2000, 2003, 2010, 2011
Hall of Fame Inductions:  
United States Weightlifting Hall of Fame 1989
Greater Toledo Area Weightlifting Hall of Fame 1992
Temperance-Bedford High School Hall of Fame (athlete) 2003
Greater Lansing Area Sports Hall of Fame 2006
United States Masters Weightlifting Hall of Fame 2009 
Association of Oldetime Barbell & Strongmen Hall of Fame 2010 
Amateur Athletic Union Strength Sports Hall of Fame 2015 
World Masters Weightlifting Hall of Fame 2016

References

External links
Fred Lowe - Hall of Fame at Weightlifting Exchange

American male weightlifters
Olympic weightlifters of the United States
Weightlifters at the 1968 Summer Olympics
Weightlifters at the 1972 Summer Olympics
Weightlifters at the 1976 Summer Olympics
Living people
1947 births
Sportspeople from Toledo, Ohio
20th-century American people
21st-century American people